Ḥujr ibn ʿAdī al-Kindī, died 660 CE, was a Companion of the Islamic prophet Muhammad. He was sentenced to death by the Umayyad Caliph Muawiyah I for his unwavering support and praise for Ali, the fourth Rashidun Caliph for Sunni Muslims and the first Imam for Shia Muslims, when he objected to the tradition of publicly cursing Ali. He belonged to the tribe of Kinda. According to some narrations, his last wish was that his son should be executed before him lest death terrify him (his son) and therefore accede to the condition of cursing Ali.

Hujr was given two titles: "al-Kindi" and "al-Adbar". The first title was "al-Kindi", meaning The Person From Kinda, an Arabian tribe. The second title given to Hujr was "al-Adbar". Hujr, his son Humaam ibn Hajar, and some other companions are buried in Adra, in the outskirts of the Syrian capital Damascus. A mosque had been built around his grave which became a pilgrimage site for Muslims.

On 2 May 2013, Jabhat al-Nusra attacked the mausoleum and exhumed his remains. His body was taken to an unknown location by the rebels. According to a report published in The New York Times, a widely distributed Facebook photo of the desecration of the pilgrimage site gives credit for the exhumation to a man named Abu Anas al-Wazir, or Abu al-Baraa, a leader of a military group called the Islam Brigade of the Free Syrian Army.

References

History of Tabari - Hujr ibn Adi

660 deaths
Companions of the Prophet
Year of birth unknown
Kinda
7th-century executions by the Umayyad Caliphate